Columbia Central High School is a public high school located in Brooklyn, Michigan. The school serves about 440 students in grades 9 to 12. It is part of the Columbia School District.

References

External links
Columbia Central High School home page

Educational institutions in the United States with year of establishment missing
Public high schools in Michigan
Schools in Jackson County, Michigan